Viktoriya Pyatachenko (born  7 May 1989) is a Ukrainian sprinter. She has qualified for 2016 Summer Olympics. She was 4th in the 200 m event at the 2012 European Championships.

Personal bests

Outdoor

Indoor

References

External links 
 

1989 births
Living people
Ukrainian female sprinters
Athletes (track and field) at the 2016 Summer Olympics
Olympic athletes of Ukraine